The Rhein Fire are an American football team in Düsseldorf, Germany.  They play in the European League of Football (ELF) since 2022 expansion.

History
On 25 September 2021, the Rhein Fire were announced as third expansion and eleventh overall teams to play in the European League of Football from season 2022. The team would be taking the identity of the former NFL Europe team, after the league reached an agreement before the 2021 season with the NFL for the naming rights. In the 2022 preseason the management announced that former NFL Europe Rhein Fire head coach Jim Tomsula will also be the first head coach of the Rhein Fire in the European league of Football.

Stadium
The stadium is the Schauinsland-Reisen-Arena in Duisburg with a capacity for 31,500 people. They share the venue with the MSV Duisburg of the 3rd tier German association football league.

Roster

Staff

References

External links
 Official website

European League of Football teams
American football teams in Germany
Sport in Düsseldorf
Rhein Fire (ELF)
2021 establishments in Germany
American football teams established in 2021